Stephen Michael "Steve" Gleason (born March 19, 1977) is a former professional American football safety with the New Orleans Saints of the National Football League (NFL). Originally signed by the Indianapolis Colts as an undrafted free agent in 2000, he played for the Saints through the 2006 season. As a free agent in 2008, Gleason retired from the NFL after eight seasons. 

Gleason is particularly known for his block of a punt early in a 2006 game, which became a symbol of recovery in New Orleans in the team's first home game after Hurricane Katrina.

In 2011, Gleason revealed that he was battling amyotrophic lateral sclerosis (ALS or Lou Gehrig's disease). His experiences while living with the disease were captured on video over the course of a five-year period and featured in the 2016 documentary Gleason. 

In 2019, he was awarded the Congressional Gold Medal for his contributions to ALS awareness.

Early years
Born and raised in Spokane, Washington, Gleason attended high school at Gonzaga Prep, where he earned consecutive defensive MVP awards as a linebacker in the Greater Spokane League (GSL). He also played on offense as a fullback.

College
Following graduation in 1995, he accepted a scholarship to play college football at Washington State in Pullman. Gleason was a starting linebacker for the 1997 team that advanced to the Rose Bowl. He was a four-year starter for the WSU baseball team in center field and holds the school record for triples.

Professional career
Gleason was signed by the Indianapolis Colts as an undrafted free agent in 2000. He was released by the team after the preseason and was signed to the New Orleans Saints' practice squad in November. He was chosen by the Birmingham Thunderbolts with the 191st pick of the 2001 XFL Draft.

On September 25, 2006, Gleason was responsible for one of the most dramatic and memorable moments in Saints history when he blocked a punt by Atlanta Falcons punter Michael Koenen early in the first quarter of a game at the Superdome. Curtis Deloatch recovered the ball in the Falcons' end zone for a touchdown. It was the first score in the Saints' first game in New Orleans in nearly 21 months, during which time Hurricane Katrina had devastated the city and the team. 

The Saints won the game and went on to have one of the most successful seasons in their history up to that time, going to the NFC Championship that year. 

In September 2011, Gleason was awarded a Super Bowl ring by the Saints. At the same ceremony, he was awarded the key to the city of New Orleans by mayor Mitch Landrieu. In July 2012, Rebirth, a statue depicting Gleason blocking the punt, was raised outside the Superdome.

Personal life

Gleason and his wife, Michel Rae Varisco, have a son, Rivers, and a daughter, Gray. Six weeks after receiving a diagnosis of ALS, the couple discovered they were expecting their first child.

Gleason collaborated with filmmaker Sean Pamphilon to produce a documentary on his battle with ALS that would double as a video journal for his infant son, Rivers. Included in the documentary was a 12-minute clip of Saints defensive coach Gregg Williams openly encouraging his players to injure opponents prior to a January 2012 playoff game against the San Francisco 49ers. Pamphilon released the audio recording on April 4, 2012, in the wake of the Bountygate scandal. Gleason criticized the decision, saying that he did not authorize its release.

Gleason was featured in an episode of the documentary series A Football Life that detailed his career in the NFL and battle with ALS. NFL Network aired the episode in late November 2013.

In 2015, Gleason was chosen to receive the 2015 George Halas Award from the Pro Football Writers Association. He was presented the award at the Thursday Night Football game between the Saints and Falcons on October 15, 2015. Near the end of the first quarter, he watched as Saints linebacker Michael Mauti blocked a punt by Falcons punter Matt Bosher and returned it for a touchdown to give the Saints a 14–0 lead. Mauti, a New Orleans native and the son of former Saints player Rich Mauti, had attended the 2006 game where Gleason made his famous block. The Saints went on to beat the Falcons, 31–21. After the blocked punt, Gleason tweeted: "Hey, Falcons. #NeverPunt -SG".

The documentary film Gleason was shown during the 2016 Sundance Film Festival. In 2019, Gleason was awarded with the Congressional Gold Medal for his contributions to ALS awareness, and became the first NFL player to receive the award. Gleason was presented with the award at a ceremony in Washington, D.C. on January 15, 2020.

In the Netflix original movie Project Power, actor Joseph Gordon-Levitt wears a Gleason jersey in several scenes.

References

External links

 TeamGleason.org
 Washington State bio

1977 births
Living people
American football linebackers
American football safeties
Gonzaga Preparatory School alumni
Indianapolis Colts players
New Orleans Saints players
People with motor neuron disease
Players of American football from Spokane, Washington
Washington State Cougars baseball players
Washington State Cougars football players
Congressional Gold Medal recipients
Baseball players from Spokane, Washington